Supernatural is the fifth studio album from DC Talk. As of 2021, it is the last album released by DC Talk that features all-new studio material and it debuted on the US Billboard Chart at No. 4, selling 106,213 copies. It was certified platinum three years after its release on February 21, 2002. A remastered edition was released in 2013. It released on vinyl in 2015.

Track listing

No commercial singles were released but there were promotional singles released for "Consume Me", "Into Jesus", "Wanna Be Loved", "Dive", "Supernatural", "My Friend (So Long)" and "Godsend" with them gaining major airplay in their singles market. Billboard Top 40, Alternative Rock radio and AC/CHR. "Consume Me" and "My Friend, So Long" were released as videos as well.

The title track, "Supernatural", is featured on two of the Angel Wars trailers, as well as the main song on the first episode DVD main menu. "Wanna Be Loved" was covered by Chris Sligh on a Season 6 episode of American Idol. "The Truth" was originally recorded for The X-Files: The Album, the soundtrack for The X-Files film Fight the Future, but didn't make the cut.

"Into Jesus" appears on WOW 1999, "Consume Me" appears on WOW 2000 and Commencemix, "Red Letters" appears on WOW Hits 2001.

Personnel 

DC Talk
 Toby Mac
 Kevin Max
 Michael Tait

Musicians

 Mark Heimmerman
 Rick May
 Brent Barcus
 George Cocchini
 Dann Huff
 Jerry McPherson 
 Will Owsley
 Pete Stewart
 Brent Milligan
 Otto Price 
 Todd Collins 
 Greg Wells
 Scott Williamson
 Tom Howard – string arrangements 
 Carl Marsh – string arrangements
 Carl Gorodetzky
 The Nashville String Machine

Production

 Mark Heimmerman – producer 
 Toby McKeehan – producer 
 Eddie DeGarmo – A&R 
 Danny Goodwin – A&R
 Todd Robbins – engineer 
 Robert "Void" Caprio – additional engineer 
 Bryan Lenox – additional engineer 
 David Schober – additional engineer 
 F. Reid Shippen – additional engineer 
 Kent Hitchcock – assistant engineer 
 Pete Martinez – assistant engineer
 Mike Purcell – assistant engineer
 Reid "Elemental" Waltz – assistant engineer
 Steve MacMillan – mixing at The Castle, Franklin, Tennessee
 Joe Costa – mix assistant 
 PJ Heimmerman – production manager 
 Deborah Norcross – art direction, design 
 Alastair Thain – cover photography 
 Len Peltier – band photography

Studios
 House of Insomnia, Franklin, Tennessee – recording
 Fun Attic Studio, Franklin, Tennessee – recording
 Javelina Studios, Nashville, Tennessee – recording
 The White House, Nashville, Tennessee – recording
 Sixteenth Avenue Sound, Nashville, Tennessee – recording

References

DC Talk albums
1998 albums
ForeFront Records albums